Pantotheria is an abandoned taxon of Mesozoic mammals.  This group is now considered an informal "wastebasket" taxon and has been replaced by Dryolestida as well as other groups.  It is sometimes treated as an infraclass and older books refer to it as being related to symmetrodonts.  One classification makes it an infraclass with a single order, Eupantotheria.

Taxonomy
List of mammals that were at one time included in the group Pantotheria

Genus †Tribactonodon bonfieldi Sigogneau-Russell, Hooker & Ensom 2001
Genus †Paraungulatum rectangularis Bonaparte 1999
Genus †Argaliatherium robustum  Cifelli & Davis 2015
Genus †Carinalestes murensis Cifelli & Davis 2015
Genus †Hypomylos Sigogneau-Russell 1992
Family †Picopsidae Fox 1980
Genus †Picopsis pattersoni Fox 1980
Genus †Tirotherium aptum Montellano-Ballesteros & Fox 2015
Family †Casamiqueliidae Bonaparte 1999
Genus †Casamiquelia rionegrina Bonaparte 1990
Genus †Rougiertherium tricuspes Bonaparte 1999
Genus †Alamitherium bishopi Bonaparte 1999
Family †Brandoniidae Bonaparte 1992
Genus †Brandonia intermedia Bonaparte 1992 
Family †Donodontidae Sigogneau-Russell 1991
Genus †Donodon presciptoris Sigogneau-Russell 1991
Family †Paurodontidae Marsh 1887
Genus †Brancatherulum tendagurense Dietrich, 1927
Genus †Comotherium richi Prothero 1981
Genus †Dorsetodon haysomi Ensom & Sigogneau-Russell 1998
Genus †Drescheratherium acutum Krebs 1998
Genus †Euthlastus cordiformis Simpson 1927
Genus †Henkelotherium guimarotae Krebs 1991
Genus †Paurodon valens Marsh 1887
Genus †Tathiodon agilis (Simpson 1927) Simpson 1927 [Tanaodon Simpson 1927 non Kirk 1927; Tanaodon agilis Simpson 1927]
Family †Vincelestidae Bonaparte 1986
Genus †Vincelestes neuquenianus Bonaparte 1986 
Order †Spalacotheriida Prothero 1981 [Spalacotheroidea Prothero 1981; Quirogatheria Bonaparte 1992]
Genus †Maotherium Rougier, Ji & Novacek 2003
†M. sinensis Rougier, Ji & Novacek 2003
†M. asiaticus Ji et al. 2009
Family †Thereuodontidae Sigogneau-Russell 1998
Genus †Thereuodon Sigogneau-Russell 1987
†T. dahmanii Sigogneau-Russell 1987
†T. taraktes Sigogneau-Russell & Ensom 1998
Order †Meridiolestida Rougier, Apesteguia & Gaetano 2011
Genus †Leonardus cuspidatus Bonaparte 1990
Genus †Cronopio dentiacutus Rougier, Apesteguia & Gaetano 2011
Family †Necrolestidae Ameghino 1894
Genus †Necrolestes Ameghino 1894 sensu Rougier et al. 2012
†N. patagonensis Ameghino 1891
†N. mirabilis Goin et al. 2007
Family †Reigitheriidae Bonaparte 1990
Genus †Reigitherium bunodontum Bonaparte 1990
Family †Peligotheriidae Bonaparte, Van Valen & Kramartz 1993
Genus †Peligrotherium Bonaparte, Van Valen & Kramartz 1993
Family †Mesungulatidae Bonaparte 1986 sensu Rougier et al. 2009
Genus †Coloniatherium Rougier et al. 2009
Genus †Quirogatherium Bonaparte 1990
Genus †Mesungulatum Bonaparte & Soria 1985
Order †Dryolestida Prothero 1981 sensu stricto Rougier et al. 2012
Family †Barbereniidae Bonaparte 1990
Genus †Barberenia Bonaparte 1990
†B. araujoae Bonaparte 1990
†B. allenensis Rougier et al. 2008
Family †Dryolestidae Marsh 1879
Genus †Anthracolestes Averianov, Martin & Lopatin 2014
Genus †Guimarotodus Martin 1999
Genus †Krebsotherium Martin 1999
Genus †Phascolestes Owen 1871 
Genus †Lakotalestes luoi Cifelli, Davis & Sames 2014
Genus †Laolestes Simpson 1927
Genus †Achyrodon Owen 1871
Genus †Amblotherium Owen 1871
Genus †Dryolestes Marsh 1878
Genus †Portopinheirodon Martin 1999
Genus †Kurtodon Osborn 1887
Genus †Crusafontia Henkel & Krebs 1969
Genus †Groeberitherium Bonaparte 1986
Order †Amphitheriida Prothero 1981
Family †Amphitheriidae Owen 1846
Genus †Amphibetulimus Lopatin & Averianov 2007
Genus †Amphitherium de Blainville 1838
Order †Peramurida McKenna 1975
Family †Peramuridae Kretzoi 1946
Genus †Kiyatherium cardiodens Maschenko, Lopatin & Voronkevich 2002
Genus †Tendagurutherium dietrichi Heinrich 1998
Genus †Peramuroides tenuiscus Davis 2012
Genus †Kouriogenys minor (Owen 1871) Davis 2012 [Spalacotherium minus Owen 1871]
Genus †Peramus Owen 1871
Genus †Palaeoxonodon Freeman 1976
Genus †Abelodon Brunet et al. 1991
Genus †Pocamus Canudo & Cuenca-Bescós 1996

References

External links
 http://taxonomicon.taxonomy.nl/TaxonTree.aspx?id=59655&tree=0.1&syn=1
 http://www.answers.com/pantotheria

Mesozoic mammals
Jurassic first appearances
Jurassic extinctions
Fossil taxa described in 1880
Obsolete mammal taxa